The Directorate of the Ministry for Internal Affairs in Krasnoyarsk Krai (ГУ МВД России по Красноярскому краю) or simply the Krasnoyarsk Police (Полиция Красноярья) is the main law enforcement agency of the Government of Krasnoyarsk Krai, Russia. It is answerable to the regional MVD and the Governor of Krasnoyarsk Krai.

Structure
 Department for Safety Roads of Krasnoyarsk (ГИБДД Красноярска) - The Traffic Police
 Operations Unit (Подразделения полиции по оперативной работе)
 Patrol Unit (Подразделения полиции по охране общественного порядка)
 Investigations (Подразделения следствия)
 Security and Protection (Подразделения управления и обеспечения)

Management
The Head of the MVD Directorate in Krasnoyarsk Krai (Начальник ГУ МВД РФ по Красноярскому краю) is Police Lieutenant-General Vadim Valentinovich Antonov, a former KGB-FSB officer. He is serving as a Head of regional police since April 2011.

External links

Official Website
Krasnoyarsk Traffic Police // Official webpage

Krasnoyarsk Krai
Law enforcement agencies of Russia